The 2007 Nigerian House of Representatives elections in Federal Capital Territory was held on April 21, 2007, to elect members of the House of Representatives to represent Federal Capital Territory, Nigeria.

Overview

Summary

Results

Abaji/Gwagwalada/Kwali/Kuje 
Party candidates registered with the Independent National Electoral Commission to contest in the election. PDP candidate Isah Egah Dobi won the election.

Amac/Bwari 
Party candidates registered with the Independent National Electoral Commission to contest in the election. ANPP candidate Austen Peters-Pam Amanda Iyabode won the election.

References 

Federal Capital Territory House of Representatives elections
2007 elections in Nigeria
April 2007 events in Nigeria